Dr. Tsilla Hershco is an Israeli historian and political scientist. She specializes in France-Israel relations, EU-Israel relations, U.S.-France relations, France and the Mideast conflict, Jews and Muslims in France as well as the History of the Jews in France, the Holocaust in France and the Jewish resistance in France. She earned her Ph.D. at Bar-Ilan University and works as senior  research associate at the Begin–Sadat Center for Strategic Studies (BESA) at Bar-Ilan University. She ia also a "Spiegel Fellow" at the Center of Holocaust research at Bar Ilan University.She is a member of the committee to Recognize the Heroism  of  Jewish Rescuers During the Holocaust (JRJ). Jewish Rescuers Citation

Publications

Books

Entre Paris et Jérusalem, La France, le Sionisme et la création de l'Etat d'Israël 1945-1949, https://www.slatkine.com/recherche?titre=&auteur=&category=-&collection=-&noserie=&ean=&pardu=&parau=&aparaitre=on&paru=on&orderby=auteur&orderway=asc&advSearch=1&keyword=hershco&send=
https://www.google.com/search? Bibliothèque d'Etudes juives, 2003 (Preface by Shimon Peres) (French)
Those Who Walk in Darkness Will See the Light: The Jewish French Resistance during the Holocaust and the Creation of Israel, 1940-1949, Israel Galili Center,  2003 (Hebrew)

Contributions

BESA Research Publications
	Israel-France Defense and Security Cooperation in the 21st Century, Mideast Security and Policy Studies No. 81, Summary, January 2014,   
	Israel-France Defense and Security Cooperation in the 21st Century, Mideast Security and Policy Studies No. 101, July 2013 (Hebrew, 77pp). [http://besacenter.org/mideast-security-and-policy-studies/french-israeli-security-cooperation-in-the-twenty-first-century-hebrew/ שיתוף פעולה בטחוני בין צרפת וישראל במאה עשרים ואחת

Articles
1.	The Jewish Resistance in France 
Tsilla Hershco, Women in the Jewish Resistance in France, in: Judith Tydor Baumel and Alan Schneider (eds), All Our Brothers and Sisters, Jews Saving Jews During the Holocaust, Peter Lang, Bern, Berlin, Bruxelles, New York, Oxford, April 2020,  pp. 155–168. https://merhav.nli.org.il/primo-explore/search?query=any,contains,Contains.997009861400405171%20Women%20in%20the%20Jewish%20Resistance%20in%20France.,AND&tab=default_tab&search_scope=Local&vid=NLI&mode=advanced&offset=0
Tsilla Hershco “It is Time to Recognize the Contribution of the Jewish Resistance the Rescue of Jews in France”, BESA Perspectives Paper, No. 1719 August 30, 2020.  It Is Time to Recognize the Contribution of the Jewish Resistance in the Rescue of the Jews of France
Tsilla Hershco. “The French Jewish Community and the Memory of the Jewish Resistance in France (1940-2006), in: Erik Cohen (ed.), French Jewry Between Particularism and Universalism” in: Modern and Contemporary History, Dahan Center, Bar-Ilan University, June 2015, pp. 75–94 (Hebrew). 
Tsilla Hershco, “Zionism in France during the Holocaust and the Creation of Israel: 1940-1948”, in: Alon Gal (ed.), World Regional Zionism, Geo-Cultural Dimensions, Vol III, Zalman Shazar Center for Jewish History,2010,  pp. 93–110 (Hebrew). 
Tsilla Hershco, « La France, la Shoah et la Création de l'Etat d'Israël », Controverses No. 7, Mai 2008, pp. 117–140. 
Tsilla Hershco, “The Jewish Resistance in France during WWII: the Gap Between History and Memory”, Jewish Political Studies Review 19:1-2, 2007, pp. 49–57. 
Préface aux Réseaux de la Résistance juive en France, Organisation juive de combat, Résistance/sauvetage France 1940-1945, autrement, 2002, pp. 37–41, 117–121, 171–175, 231–233, 245–250, 375–378, 407–408, 415–416
	
2. Israel-France - the EU
Tsilla Hershco, “Macron vs. Radical Political Islam in France: A War of Civilization?”,  BESA Center Perspectives Paper, No. 1803, November 6, 2020. https://besacenter.org/wp-content/uploads/2020/11/1803-Macron-and-Radical-Political-Islam-Hershco-English-final.pdf
Tsilla Hershco, “Can France Bring Stability to Crisis –Plagued Lebanon”?  BESA Center Perspectives Paper No. 1,746, September 14, 2020. Can France Bring Stability to Crisis-Plagued Lebanon?
Tsilla Hershco, “The EU and the Coronavirus Pandemic”, BESA Center Perspectives Paper, No. 1,515, April 1, 2020. The EU and the Coronavirus Pandemic
Tsilla Hershco, “Contradictions in  France’s Fight Against Antisemitic Violence”, BESA Center Perspectives Paper No. 1,485, March 16, 2020. Contradictions in France’s Fight Against Antisemitic Violence
Tsilla Hershco, “France and the Urban Guerilla Warfare of the Black Blocs”, BESA Center Perspectives Paper No. 1,180, May 22, 2019. France and the Urban Guerrilla Warfare of the Black Blocs
Tsilla Hershco, “The Yellow Vests in France: Social Protest, Violence and anti-Semitism” , BESA Center Perspectives Paper No. 1,099, February 28, 2019.  The “Yellow Vests” in France: Social Protest, Violence, and Antisemitism
Tsilla Hershco, “France’s fight against Islamic Radicalization, the Writing is Still on the Wall”, BESA Center Perspectives Paper,  No. 967, October 5, 2018. France’s Fight Against Islamic Radicalization: The Writing Is Still on the Wall
Tsilla Hershco, « Macron’s Proactive Position on Iran : Dialogue vs. Sanctions ».  BESA Center Perspectives Paper,  No. 775, March 20, 2018 . Macron’s Proactive Position on Iran: Dialogue vs. Sanctions
Tsilla Hershco, “The Impact of the Isis Terror Attacks on Europe”, April 2017. BESA Center Perspectives Paper, No. 456, April 30, 2017. The Impact of the ISIS Terror Attacks on Europe
Tsilla Hershco, “Israel-EU security and defense relations in the context of the ‘Arab Spring’ ", in: The EU, Israel and the "Arab Spring" Beyond the Status Quo?, Centre de Recherche Français de Jérusalem, CNRS, Bulletin du CRFJ, No. 25, 31 Janvier 2015.https://journals.openedition.org/bcrfj/7306
Tsilla Hershco, “Jews and Muslims in France in Light of French Mideast Policy", in: Bernard Dov Cooperman and Zvi Zohar (eds.),  Jews and Muslims, Dahan Center, Bar Ilan University, Maryland University, 2013, pp. 185–207.
Tsilla Hershco, "After Toulouse: combating Anti-Semitism in France", BESA Perspectives Papers, No. 169, April 2012. 
The French diplomacy during the war of Independence : 1947–1949, Yad Israel Galili, Military History Society, Tel Aviv University, Defense Ministry editions, 2008, pp. 344–368 (Hebrew)

Press Articles 

"Sur le fond de divergences persistent avec Sarkozy", interview sur lci.fr, 21 June 2008

Rina Basist, Jewish Holocaust heroes and heroines honored in Paris, February 14, 2014
https://www.jpost.com/Diaspora/Jewish-Holocaust-heroes-and-heroines-honored-in-Paris-481463

Videos
Dr. Tsilla Hershco, Spiegel Fellows conference:  Boys and Girls, Who Rescued Jews in the Framework of the Jewish Resistance in France, 30 September 2020" (Hebrew). YouTube צילה הרשקו,"נערים ונערות שהצילו יהודים במסגרת הרזיסטנס היהודי בצרפת", כנס שפיגל, אוניברסיטת בר-אילן,30 בספטמבר,2020                                                          
Tsilla Hershco, André Chouraqui dans la Résistance Juive en France,  (20min) (Hebrew, French). https://akadem.org/sommaire/colloques/centenaire-de-la-naissance-d-andre-chouraqui/autour-de-la-seconde-guerre-mondiale-23-11-2017-96481_4769.php  
Remise de prix à la famille Chouraqui avec Alan Schneider, Annette Chouraqui (8min)
https://web.archive.org/web/20110721204635/http://www.akadem.org/sommaire/une/politique/module_4443.php?chapitre_courant=1 
"Hésitations Françaises sur la Reconnaissance de l'Etat d'Israël", conference, May 2008 http://www.akadem.org/sommaire/themes/histoire/3/9/module_8470.php 
Tsilla Hershco,"La memoire de la Shoah et de resistance en Algerie a travers l'histoire de la famille Belz" Judaisme du Magreb,  conference, Universite de Paris I- Sorbonne-Universite Bar Ilan Paris, Juin 2010. https://akadem.org/sommaire/colloques/judaismes-du-maghreb-et-la-france-traditions-et-transformations/histoire-et-culture-27-09-2010-12123_4145.php

References

External links
Begin–Sadat Center for Strategic Studies
Bar-Ilan University
https://jewish-faculty.biu.ac.il/en/node/1267

Living people
Year of birth missing (living people)